The National Partnership for Reinventing Government (NPR) was a U.S. government reform initiative launched in 1993 by Vice President Al Gore, with the goal of making the federal government "work better, cost less, and get results Americans care about." The initiative aimed to improve the efficiency, effectiveness, and accountability of the federal government by streamlining processes, cutting bureaucracy, and implementing innovative solutions. The NPR was active until 1998 and during its five years of existence, it resulted in a number of significant changes in the way the federal government operates, including the elimination of over 100 programs, the reduction of over 250,000 federal jobs, and the consolidation of over 800 agencies. The NPR also introduced the use of performance measurements and customer satisfaction surveys, and encouraged the use of technology to improve government services. Despite some criticisms, the NPR is widely recognized as a major effort to improve the effectiveness and efficiency of the U.S. government and has had a lasting impact on the way government operates.

History

Background 
In March 1993, President Bill Clinton stated that he planned to "reinvent government" when he declared that "Our goal is to make the entire federal government less expensive and more efficient, and to change the culture of our national bureaucracy away from complacency and entitlement toward initiative and empowerment."  After this, Clinton put the project into Vice President Al Gore's hands with a six-month deadline for a proposal for the plan.  The National Performance Review (NPR) released its first report in September 1993, which contained 384 recommendations for improving bureaucracy's performance across the entire federal government The report was the product of months’ worth of consultation of various government departments and meetings within Clinton's bureaucracy, which narrowed down 2,000 pages of proposals to the final report.

NPR promised to save the federal government about $108 billion: $40.4 billion from a "smaller bureaucracy", $36.4 billion from program changes, and $22.5 billion from streamlining contracting processes. Each of the recommendations would fall into three categories: whether it required legislative action, presidential action, or internal bureaucratic reform. Major branches of bureaucracy that were targeted were the US Department of Agriculture, the Department of the Interior, the Agency for International Development (AID), Health and Human Services (HHS), the Department of Labor, and Housing and Urban Development (HUD). The first-year status report of the NPR claimed that, pending Congressional action, likely savings would amount to about $12.2 billion in 1994.

In 1993, Congress rejected many key provisions of the NPR downsizing when it came to individual departmental cuts, proving that NPR could not sustain its reforms without modest congressional support. As Donald Kettl points out, the NPR's biggest hurdle was that "although [it] had a strategy leading to the release of its report on September 7, 1993, it had no strategy for September 8 and afterward." Still, key legislation successfully passed throughout the reform effort was the NPR's procurement reforms—the Federal Acquisition Streamlining Act of 1994, the Federal Acquisition Reform Act of 1995, and the Clinger-Cohen Act in 1996.

In a September 1996 pamphlet, Gore wrote that the federal government had reduced its workforce by nearly 24,000 as of January 1996, and that thirteen of the fourteen departments had reduced the size of their workforce. In addition, thousands of field offices that were considered "obsolete" closed.

Toward the end of Clinton's first term, the task of the NPR became less to "review and recommend" and more to "support agencies in their reinventing goals", reflected in the change of the senior advisor from Elaine Kamarck to Morley Winograd. It was also around this time that the name change occurred to reflect more engagement with relevant public institutions such as student loans, the IRS, and emergency preparedness.

Creation 
The creation of the National Partnership for Reinventing Government was announced during U.S. President Bill Clinton's address on March 3, 1993, to a special joint session of the United States Congress This initiative was a reinvention of an effort formerly known as the National Performance Review, and consisted of a proposed six-month efficiency review of the federal government spearheaded by U.S. Vice President Al Gore. The aim for the initiative was to create a government that "works better, costs less, and gets results Americans care about." However, Vice President Gore went beyond preparing a report to lead an effort that evolved into the longest-running and, arguably, most successful reform effort in U.S. history to date.

In the address to a joint session of Congress on March 3, 1993, President Clinton provided rationale for implementing the NPR: "The conditions which brought us as a nation to this point are well known. Two decades of low productivity growth and stagnant wages, persistent unemployment and underemployment, years of huge government and declining investment in our future, exploding health care costs, and lack of coverage for millions of Americans, legions of poor children, education and job training opportunities inadequate to the demands of this tough global economy."

The stated intention of the NPR was to "invent government that puts people first, by: serving its customers, empowering its employees, and fostering excellence." In order to achieve this, the objectives of the NPR were to "create a clear sense of mission; delegate authority and responsibility; replace regulations with incentives; develop budget-based outcomes; and measure [our] success by customer satisfaction."

Clinton's address on March 3 was a call to arms aimed at both branches of government and the political parties. His proposition to establish and implement the NPR consisted of four components, detailing the shift from
 consumption to investment in both the public and private sectors,
 changing the rhetoric of public decision making so that it honors work and families,
 substantially reducing federal debt, and
 administering government spending and cuts.

Gore presented the report of his National Performance Review to President Clinton and the public on September 7, 1993. Gore cited the long-term goal was to "change the very culture of the federal government," and designated "optimism" and "effective communication" as the keys to success of the NPR.

In September 1993, the National Performance Review issued its initial report, noting that successful organizations—businesses, city and state governments, and organizations of the federal government—do four things well. These four things became the recipe for reinventing government: 1) Put customers first; 2) Cut red tape; 3) Empower employees to get results; 4) Cut back to basics.

Legacy 
The Hammer Award was created by Vice President Gore to recognize government efficiency as a part of the program.  Made simply of a $6 hammer, a striped ribbon and an aluminum-framed note from Gore, the award parodies the Pentagon's infamous bloated hardware costs, including the infamous $436 hammer. (The cost of the hammer was actually an artifact of government accounting rules, and include not just the cost of the equipment but also a portion of the overhead cost of the entire project it was associated with.)

General trends in the federal government

NPR and streamlining 
Many attempts at reducing red tape involved streamlining grant processes and listening to the recommendations of the NPR. The U.S. Department of Commerce "streamlin[ed] the internal grants process" in order to reduce the amount of paperwork involved in applications for financial assistance. The Department of Transportation has transitioned to electronic submission of grant forms. The Alamo Federal Executive Board Reinvention Lab in Texas works to "remove unnecessary regulations… so that intergovernmental employees may work together as partners" and eliminate problems together.

NPR and national service 
In addition to its association with executive branch reform, the NPR's reinvention movement is tightly bound to the idea of national service. In the words of President Bill Clinton, "National Service is nothing less than the American way to change America. It is rooted in the concept of community: the simple idea that every one of us, no matter how many privileges with which we are born, can still be enriched by the contributions of the least of us." Because National Service is so closely tied to the American citizens, Clinton and Gore recognized its role in government reinvention since a main purpose of the NPR is to respond to the needs of the people. In 1993, the Corporation for National Service (CNS) was created to further "develop and expand the President's reinvention themes." Like the ideals of the National Performance Review, the main goal of the CNS was to yield fast results. Likewise, the CNS was dedicated to producing "well-informed decisions without delay, keep[ing] staffing lean and flexible, multiply[ing] resources, and delegat[ing] authority and responsibility in-house and in the field."

Impact on government entities

NPR and the Department of Housing and Urban Development 
The original 168-page report of the National Performance Review made a total of 255 agency-specific recommendations, 10 of which were directed at the Department of Housing and Urban Development (HUD). A few of these recommendations are listed below to show the type of request the government had in mind. The report recommended that HUD eliminate their annual budget reviews and work with congress to change rent rules that would create strong incentives for people to move from public housing as soon as they find jobs.

A brief list as stated above of some of the recommendations for the Housing and Urban Development.
 "Reinvent Public housing": This was to improve housing management, eliminate unnecessary procedures and help provide a broader range of choices for public housing tenants.
 "Improving management over multifamily assets and disposition": This will help spot financial assets for the HUD and give them a better solution on how to act on public-private partnerships, issues with loans and reduce the tension placed upon them by the FHA insurance programs.
 "Establish a New Housing Production Program": This recommendation is describing what needs to happen to improve availability for loans for multifamily housing, create a partnership between FHA, non-profits and the government to help resurrect old/dying neighborhoods.

NPR and defense spending 
According to military strategist Isaiah Wilson III, there were two phases to the National Performance Review, the second of which was commenced on January 3, 1995, by Vice President Al Gore. The aim of Phase 2 was to "examine the basic mission of government…to find and eliminate things that don’t need to be done by the government."

While another focus of the NPR was to cut down on red tape bureaucracy, in regards to the adjustments made to the Defense Department, Wilson argues that a fundamental step towards actual reinvention was skipped. The Arms Export Control Act, which is viewed as the essential piece of legislation regarding the trading of arms and related technologies, has remained essentially untouched since 1976 even after phase 2 of the NPR.

Defense spending began to decrease in 1991, after the end of the Cold War. This trend continued until the September 11 attacks in 2001, which began the War on Terror. The NPR did not significantly affect defense spending, which largely depends on international affairs and conflict. While the defense budget has fluctuated by billions of dollars, defense spending relative to U.S. GDP has only fluctuated within 1–2%.

The NPR also aimed to improve general customer satisfaction with all dealings involving the federal government. In terms of foreign military sales, however, there is a dilemma of whether or not the federal government's main "customer" should be the foreign nations purchasing arms and technologies or the American taxpayer who in part pays for the service provided by the defense department.

NPR and shrinking workforce 
Downsizing was a common goal for every factor of government including management. After decades of ineffective government the Clinton-Gore administration and their team of advisers were looking for a solution. Gore recognized that the problem passed the restricted system government employees have to work within. Gore instead decided to look from the top to bottom. Supervisor are found at every level of government and have a direct influence on the employee and the workplace. The NPR sought to drive supervisors to take accountability for their unproductive work.

With multiple pressures from legislature Clinton constructed a proposal to increase decentralization by eliminating the United States Office of Personnel Management (OPM). Past methods of employment through this agency made applicants apply to multiple civil service jobs rather than just the job of their interest. Managers were given more human resource responsibility and could influence the careers of their employees.

Despite the employee gaining the ability to apply to individual organizations there was criticism of the shrinking government. The dean of the School of Public Policy at the University of Maryland, Donald Kettl recalls the problem of the shrinking government stating "The reduction didn’t happen in a way that matched workforce needs because they used a strategy for downsizing to hit a target". Kettl also believed that the idea of downsizing public service was a higher priority than actually making the system better itself. The NPR sought to eliminate "inspectors general, controllers, procurement officers and personnel specialists.

Project Director and "Energizer in Chief" Bob Stone aimed for a no-layoff policy but failed. Stone worked closely with the OPM to gain support for a buyout program that offered payments up to 50,000 to persuade employees to leave. As a result, more than 25,000 employees were laid off.

NPR and the Government Printing Office 
Apart from Defense spending, the NPR also narrowed its sights on government printing, namely the operation of the Government Printing Office (GPO).  According to recommendations made by the NPR, the GPO was seen as a monopoly on government printing and was responsible for great spending waste. The three specific recommendations read as follow:
 Authorize the executive branch to establish a printing policy that will eliminate the current printing monopoly.
 Ensure public access to federal information.
 Develop integrated electronic access to government information and services.

NPR and the Executive Branch 
One way Vice President Al Gore intended to put his plan into action was by reducing the number of workers in the executive branch. Many agencies saw the downsizing as detrimental to their efficiency because it left them "shorthanded in the delivery of programs and services." However, Gore recognized that a smaller workforce would allow agencies to focus on customer service instead of managing an unnecessary number of workers. This emphasis on customer service coincides with Gore's determination to focus on what the citizens want from the government. Aside from diminishing the size of executive agencies, the report also suggests "redefin[ing] the role of the institutional presidency" by reducing the management role. This would involve "devolving management authority to the lowest level possible and shift[ing] accountability from the President to agency ‘customers." In this case, lowest level refers to the interagency committees; however, management duties would be assigned to "the politically appointed leadership in the departments and agencies.

Other similar commissions 
While government reformation efforts often come relatively soon into a president's term, it is rare for president-elects to push for reform immediately on taking office. Presidents often realize the need for reform relatively quickly in order to make their policy goals achievable. These efforts may arise for a variety of reasons, whether substantive or symbolic. The substantive reasons may include motives such as "enhancing the capacity of the president to manage the bureaucracy, rationalizing the structure of government, and making career officials more responsive to political direction." Symbolic reform proposals are oftentimes associated with the state of the economy, the amount of waste produced by government organizations, among other reasons. Government reform has been practiced for over a century, beginning in 1905 with Theodore Roosevelt's Keep Commission. The following are examples of reformation commissions:
 Brownlow Committee, 1937
 Hoover Commission, two commissions in 1947–1949 and 1953–1955.
 Grace Commission, 1982–1984
 Project on National Security Reform, 2006–2012

References

External links
 

Clinton administration initiatives
History of the government of the United States
United States national commissions
Waste of resources